Bebrina is a village and a municipality in the Brod-Posavina County, Croatia. There are a total of 3,252 inhabitants in the municipality with 95.42% Croats and 2.55% Ukrainians (2011 census).

The people live in 7 settlements:

 Banovci - 357
 Bebrina - 494
 Dubočac - 202
 Kaniža - 808
 Stupnički Kuti - 384
 Šumeće - 580
 Zbjeg - 427

References

Municipalities of Croatia
Populated places in Brod-Posavina County